Heinrich Gies (1912–1973) was a German film and television actor.

Selected filmography
 Geheimakten Solvay (1953) - Kellner im ZK
 Der Teufelskreis (1956) - Major Weberstedt
 Die Millionen der Yvette (1956) - Heim - Polizeipräsident
 The Captain from Cologne (1956) - Dinkelburg
 Zwei Mütter (1957) - Amerikanischer Bezirksrichter
 Wo Du hin gehst (1957) - Otto
  (1960)
 Ordered to Love (1961) - Obersturmbannführer
 My Husband, the Economic Miracle (1961) - Artz
  (1961) - Schuldirektor
 The Marriage of Mr. Mississippi (1961) - Kriegsminister (uncredited)
  (1961) - Lohmann
 The Dream of Lieschen Mueller (1961)
 Auf Wiedersehen (1961) - Don Howley
  (1962) - Ellison, Chefinspektor
  (1962) - Optiker 
 Sherlock Holmes and the Deadly Necklace (1962) - Texas Buyer
 The Squeaker (1963) - Brownie (uncredited)
 The Curse of the Hidden Vault (1964) - Wächter (uncredited)
 Hotel by the Hour (1970) - Paul Rehschopf

References

Bibliography
 Hutchings, Peter. Terence Fisher. Manchester University Press, 2001.

External links

1912 births
1973 deaths
German male television actors
German male film actors